Amritsar East Assembly constituency (Sl. No.: 18) is a Punjab Legislative Assembly constituency in Amritsar district, Punjab state, India.

Members of Legislative Assembly

Election results

2022

2017 result

2012 result

Previous results

References

External links
  

Assembly constituencies of Punjab, India
Amritsar district